Bartın University is a public university located in Bartın, Turkey. It was established in 2008.

Campus 

The university is composed of two campuses, one located in Ağdacı and one in Kutlubeyyazıcılar, both villages within the district of Bartın.

Academics

Faculties 
 Faculty of Literature
 Faculty of Education
 Faculty of Economics and Administrative Sciences
 Faculty of Engineering
 Faculty of Forestry
 Faculty of Sciences
 Faculty of Islamic Sciences

Institutes 
 Institute of Educational Sciences
 Graduate School of Natural Applied Sciences
 Institute of Social Sciences

Schools and Vocational Schools 
 School of Physical Education and Sports 
 Vocational School
 Vocational School of Health

Departments Under the Rectorate 
 Furniture Workshop
 Department of Foreign Languages 
 Department of Atatürk's Principles and History 
 Department of Turkish Language 
 Department of İnformatics 
 Department of Physical Education and Sports
 Department of Fine Arts
 Project and Technology Office

References

External links
Website

Universities and colleges in Turkey
2008 establishments in Turkey
State universities and colleges in Turkey
Educational institutions established in 2008
Bartın